Peter Savaryn (September 17, 1926 – April 6, 2017) was a Ukrainian-born Canadian lawyer.

During World War II, he belonged to the Waffen-SS Galician Division. He immigrated from Ukraine in 1949, and attended the University of Alberta (B.A. 1955, LLB 1956). Savaryn was a partner in the law firm Savaryn & Savaryn. He was married to Olga (Olya) Prystajecky (1951) with whom he had three children. He served as Chancellor of the University of Alberta from 1982 to 1986 and was involved with the university Board of Governors and Senate.

Savaryn was awarded an honorary degree in 1987 from the University of Alberta, and was also named to the Order of Canada that year. He was also president of the Progressive Conservative Association of Alberta. He died on April 6, 2017.

References

1926 births
2017 deaths
People from Ternopil Oblast
People from Tarnopol Voivodeship
Members of the Galizien division
Canadian lawyers
Ukrainian emigrants to Canada
Members of the Order of Canada
University of Alberta alumni
University of Alberta Faculty of Law alumni
Academic staff of the University of Alberta
Chancellors of the University of Alberta